Wakulla County Airport  is a county-owned, public-use airport in Wakulla County, Florida, United States. It is located three nautical miles (6 km) south of the central business district of Panacea, Florida.

This general aviation airport is open to the public, although pilots are required to call ahead to be allowed ground access.

Facilities and aircraft 
Wakulla County Airport covers an area of 15 acres (6 ha) at an elevation of 11 feet (3 m) above mean sea level. It has one runway designated 18/36 with a turf surface measuring 2,590 by 70 feet (789 x 21 m).

For the 12-month period ending March 26, 2010, the airport had 5,475 general aviation aircraft operations, an average of 15 per day. At that time there were 10 aircraft based at this airport: 90% single-engine and 10% ultralight.

In January 2021 the Wakulla County Board of County Commissioners voted to support the establishment of an airport authority to operate the airport; an earlier attempt to establish an airport authority in 2020 failed.

References

External links 
  brochure from CFASPP

Airports in Florida
Transportation buildings and structures in Wakulla County, Florida